The Theatre of Early Music is a choir and Baroque instrumental ensemble based in Montreal, and later in Toronto.  It is conducted by Daniel Taylor. The group performs and records early sacred music. One of the group's better known pieces is Stabat Mater.

History
The Theatre of Early Music was founded by Daniel Taylor in 2001.

The recording Bach Cantatas was nominated for a Juno Award in 2003.

The group's recording Scarlatti: Stabat Mater was reviewed in the Early Music Review in 2005. It was nominated for a Juno Award in 2006.

In 2009 the group release an album, The Voice of Bach. 

In 2011 the Theatre of Early Music performed in New York City at Weill Recital Hall.

In 2015 the recording The Heart's Refuge was nominated for a Juno Award. 

The group moved its focus to Toronto when Taylor, its conductor and founder, joined the University of Toronto faculty.

In 2018, the group performed at the Music and Beyond Festival in Ottawa.

References

External links
 Theatre of early Music website

Mixed early music groups
Musical groups from Montreal
Charities based in Canada
Musical groups established in 2002
2002 establishments in Quebec